The Mujahideen Shura Council (MSC), was an umbrella organization of at least six Sunni Islamic insurgent groups taking part in the Iraqi insurgency against  U.S. and coalition and Iraqi forces: Tanzim Qaidat al-Jihad fi Bilad al-Rafidayn ('al-Qaeda in Iraq'), Jaish al-Ta'ifa al-Mansurah, Katbiyan Ansar Al-Tawhid wal Sunnah, Saraya al-Jihad Group, al-Ghuraba Brigades, and al-Ahwal Brigades.

Al-Qaeda in Iraq—part of the Mujahideen Shura Council—was in September 2006 believed by the United States to be "the most significant political force" in the Iraqi Al Anbar province.

In mid-October 2006, a statement was released, stating that the Mujahideen Shura Council had been disbanded, and was replaced by the Islamic State of Iraq.

Formation and names 
On 15 January 2006, in a statement posted to the jihadist website Hanin Net, 'al-Qaeda in Iraq' (AQI, Tanzim Qaidat al-Jihad fi Bilad al-Rafidayn) spokesman Abu Maysarah al-Iraqi announced the formation of the "Mujahideen Consultative Council" ("Majlis Shura al-Mujahideen fi al-Iraq"). It was formed to resist efforts by the American and Iraqi authorities to win over Sunni supporters of the insurgency. The stated purpose of the council was "Managing the struggle in the battle of confrontation to ward off the invading kafir (infidels) and their apostate stooges. ... Uniting the word of the mujahideen and closing their ranks...[and] determining a clear position toward developments and incidents so that people can see things clearly and the truth will not be confused with falsehood."

It united AQI with five other insurgent groups opposed to U.S. and coalition and Iraqi forces. The groups were:
 Al-Qaeda in Iraq
 Jaish al-Ta'ifa al-Mansurah
 Katbiyan Ansar al-Tawhid wal Sunnah
 Saray al-Jihad Group
 Al-Ghuraba Brigades
 Al-Ahwal Brigades
AQI continued to claim responsibility for attacks through the new council. Other sources called the council Mujahideen Shura Council in Iraq or Mujaheddin Consultative Council.

On or before 25 April 2006, a videotape of Abu Musab al-Zarqawi was released bearing the organization's logo.

Structure 
Little is known about the organizational structure of the Council, in large part due to the shadowy nature of the organization itself. al Qaeda in Iraq was the most powerful and visible group. Because of the multiple leaders the Shura Council had, there seems to have been no disruption in the Shura Council's ability to carry out attacks: more than 1,600 Iraqi civilians died in the month after Zarqawi's death, the largest number killed in a month to that date. Elements of the Shura Council's organization from the top to the bottom remain fluid due both to the nature of its aims and methods as well as its loose confederation. It was speculated that the group was dominated by al Qaeda in Iraq and that Zarqawi's death dealt a severe blow to the unity of the Council. Aside from the murky workings of the Shura Council's leadership it is known that the Council has rather smooth operations when it comes to propaganda, the Council's propaganda czar, Murasel, regularly posted updates, criticisms, and praises for the Council's own acts of violence on a semi-daily basis at blogspot.com.

Activities

MSC forms "Mutayibeen Coalition" 
MSC, including AQI, on 12 October 2006 announced their "Mutayibeen Coalition" consisting of MSC, three smaller insurgent groups, and six 'loyal' Anbar Sunni tribes counting 300,000 members.

A video on Internet showed six white-clad, masked men, representing: the Shura Council of the Jihad Fighters in Iraq (or Mujahideen Shura Council in Iraq); Jaysh Al-Fatihin ("The Army of the Conquerors"); Jund Al-Sahaba ("The Army of the Companions"); Kataib Ansar Al-Tawhid wal-Sunna ("The Monotheism and Sunna Brigades"); and "many of the sheikhs of the faithful tribes (in Iraq)"; taking an Arab "oath of the scented ones" (hilf al-mutayyabin).

They announced: "to implement God's sharia, … We swear by God/Allah to do our utmost to free the prisoners of their shackles, and to rid Sunnis from the oppression of the rejectionists (Shi'ite Muslims) and the crusader occupiers, to assist the oppressed and restore rights even at the price of our own lives… to make Allah's word supreme in the world, and to restore the glory of Islam".

MSC becomes part of 'Islamic State of Iraq' 

On 13 and 15 October 2006, messages on Internet purportedly in the name of MSC and the Mutayibeen Coalition declared the establishment of the Islamic State of Iraq (ISI) which should encompass the governorates of Baghdad, Anbar, Diyala, Kirkuk, Saladin, Nineveh and parts of Babil and Wasit – a swathe of central and western Iraq where most Sunni Arabs live.

Abu Omar al-Baghdadi was being announced as the self-proclaimed state's Emir. A Mujahideen Shura Council leader said: "God willing we will set the law of Sharia here and we will fight the Americans". The Council urged on Sunni Muslim tribal leaders to join their separate Islamic state "to protect our religion and our people, to prevent strife and so that the blood and sacrifices of your martyrs are not lost".

In reality, the group was not known to control any territory in Iraq yet. Following the announcement, scores of gunmen took part in military parades in Ramadi and other Anbar towns to celebrate.

In November, a statement was issued by Abu Ayyub al-Masri, leader of Mujahideen Shura Council (MSC), announcing the disbanding of the MSC, in favor of the ISI. After this statement, there were a few more claims of responsibility issued under the name of the Mujahideen Shura Council, but these eventually ceased and were totally replaced by claims from the Islamic State of Iraq.

References 

2006 establishments in Iraq
2006 disestablishments in Iraq
Al-Qaeda in Iraq
Factions in the Iraq War
Jihadist groups in Iraq
Organizations disestablished in 2006
Islamic State of Iraq and the Levant in Iraq